Bjurström or Bjurstrøm is a Nordic surname. Bjurström is the Swedish spelling, and Bjurstrøm is the Norwegian and Danish spelling.

Meaning
Bjurström is an ornamental or topographic name, derived from bjur (meaning beaver) and ström (meaning river).

Prevalence
This surname is most prevalent in Sweden, followed by the United States and Norway.

Notable people
Notable people with this surname include:
 Augusta Bjurström, founder of the Hammarstedtska skolan
 Hanne Bjurstrøm (born 1960), Norwegian politician
 Jonas Bjurström (born 1979), Swedish footballer
 Mait Bjurström (born 1963), Swedish curler
 Marco Bjurström (born 1966), Finnish dancer
 Rune Bjurström (1912-1996), Swedish racewalker

References